Robert Hart Cary (1885 – September 19, 1912) was an American football player and coach. He was a 1909 graduate of Yale University, where he received his Ph.B. Cary served as the head football coach at the University of Montana from 1910 to 1911, compiling a record of 5–3–1.

Head coaching record

References

External links
 

1885 births
1912 deaths
Montana Grizzlies football coaches
Montana Grizzlies football players
Yale University alumni
People from North Platte, Nebraska
Players of American football from Nebraska